Metamorphosis is the name of a stage illusion invented by John Nevil Maskelyne, but most often associated with famous escape artist Harry Houdini and performed to some renown (for speed) by The Pendragons, among others. It is also known amongst magicians as the Substitution Trunk (often abbreviated to Sub Trunk).

In the illusion, an assistant (Houdini employed his wife Bess) is locked inside a large box or trunk, often after being restrained with handcuffs, ropes, bags, etc. The magician stands on the trunk and holds a curtain up to momentarily conceal his entire body. When the curtain is lowered, it is now revealed to be the assistant standing atop the box, the magician and assistant having changed places instantaneously. When the box is opened, it is shown to contain the magician, restrained as the assistant had been.  In some acts, the magician is locked in the box first, then appears standing atop the box.

Variations include the Aquarian Illusion created in the 1970s by Alan Wakeling for Mark Wilson, who performed it in The Magic Circus series and a HBO special Mumbo Jumbo! It's Magic, and in closing his Las Vegas shows. In this version an acrylic tank filled with water is used and a beautiful swimsuit-clad woman assistant is locked inside underwater.  Penn and Teller performed the illusion in an underwater theatre with a female assistant (a Weeki Wachee "mermaid") handcuffed and locked in a steel cage on the sea bottom.  These variations add a significant element of peril.  During the performance the assistant is trapped underwater with no source of air, and if something were to go wrong she could possibly drown.

Pictured to the right is "Suspended Animation". Called the modern day metamorphosis, the trunk is suspended on a platform above the stage creating an aerial exchange. This evolution of the illusion was invented by Australian Illusionist John Taylor.

Illusionist Criss Angel assisted by Klayton and his other assistants has also performed the Metamorphosis trick as part of his "Amystika" show. In Angel's version, he was handcuffed, and put into the box with assistant standing on top of it. After the flashes and torches lit the stage, they swapped places.

A method for Metamorphosis was exposed by the Masked Magician, Val Valentino, as part of Fox TV series Breaking the Magicians' Code: Magic's Biggest Secrets Finally Revealed. He was assisted by Michelle Berube.

External links
 Video, Metamorphosis illusion performed by the Pendragons.
 Video, Aquarian Illusion performed by Mark Wilson.

References

Escapology
Magic tricks